Levitical priesthood may refer to:

 Aaronic priesthood (Latter Day Saints), an order of priesthood in Latter Day Saint movement churches
 Kohen, the priestly families in Judaism 
 Levite, a male of the tribe of Levi